<onlyinclude>

July 2022

See also

References

killings by law enforcement officers
 07